Whaleys Corners is an unincorporated community in Sussex County, Delaware, United States. Whaleys Corners is located on U.S. Route 9, southwest of Georgetown.

References

Unincorporated communities in Sussex County, Delaware
Unincorporated communities in Delaware